Boni is a 2009 Telugu-language action film that stars Sumanth and Kriti Kharbanda. It is directed by Raj Pippalla, with Ramana Gogula composing music as well as producing the film.

Cast

Sumanth as DD
Kriti Kharbanda as Pragati
Trinetrudu as Chinna
Chandra Mohan
Venu Madhav
Jaya Prakash Reddy
Ahuti Prasad
Satya Prakash
Sudha as Saraswatamma
Surekha Vani 
Tanikella Bharani as Giri 
Kota Shankar
Harsha Vardhan
Suthi Velu
Babloo
Satyam Rajesh
Antara Biswas as item number
Naresh

Plot
DD and Chinna are close friends who are raised in an orphanage. They are fond of Saraswatamma who took care of them there. Saraswatamma was very good at preparing tamarind rice (pulihora). DD wishes to start a pulihora center in memory of Saraswatamma when he grows up. In order to earn the money to do so, he joins a mafia gang doing small odd jobs. Pragati is the daughter of a millionaire politician. She is kind hearted and works for an NGO. She learns that a certain landlord has cheated the people of a village. The court, out of no choice, tells the farmers that they need to pay 40 million to the landlord if they wish to regain their land. Pragati asks her father to help out the villagers and he says, yes. Later when she finds out that her father has actually lied to her, she argues with him and leaves his house. Pragati's friend sketches a self-kidnap plan in order to demand 40 million as ransom from her father. Things go awry when DD and Chinna accidentally kidnap Pragathi at the same time as she is to be kidnapped by someone else. The rest of the story regards how DD and Pragati realise their goals while falling in love with each other.

Soundtrack
The music was composed by Ramana Gogula and released by Aditya Music. All lyrics were written by Ramajogayya Sastry.

See also
 Telugu films of 2009

References 

2009 films
2000s Telugu-language films
Indian action films
2009 action films